The Baltimore Marathon is the flagship race of several races held in Baltimore, Maryland known collectively as the Baltimore Running Festival.

The event was once one of the fastest-growing marathons in the United States, but the number of finishers in the marathon has declined each year since 2013. Additionally, the number of elite runners attending has almost disappeared since the elimination of prize money for winners following the 2012 running of the marathon. Currently Julius Kipyego Keter holds the men's record at 2:11:56 and Olena Shurkhno holds the women's record at 2:29:11.

The marathon begins at the Camden Yards sports complex and travels through many diverse neighborhoods of Baltimore, including the scenic Inner Harbor waterfront area, historic Federal Hill, Fells Point, and Canton, Baltimore. The race then proceeds to other important focal points of the city such as Patterson Park, Clifton Park, Lake Montebello, the Charles Village neighborhood and the western edge of downtown. After winding through  of Baltimore, the race ends in the Inner Harbor.

The competition was first held in 2001, but the city has featured marathon races prior to the current incarnation: the Maryland Marathon was held from 1973 to 1980 and this evolved into the Baltimore City Marathon, which was held from 1981 to 1989.

Past winners
Key:

References

List of winners
John Roemer IV, Jack Leydig (2010-10-18). Baltimore Marathon. Association of Road Racing Statisticians . Retrieved on 2011-10-14.

External links
Official website
Coverage at The Baltimore Sun

Marathons in the United States
Sports competitions in Baltimore
Recurring sporting events established in 2001